Estate Grove Place, in the Northwest subdistrict near Frederiksted on St. Croix, U.S. Virgin Islands, is a historic plantation which was listed on the National Register of Historic Places in 1978.

It includes ruins of a sugar factory, a tall chimney, and a wagon depot with 23 arched bays.

References

Sugar plantations in Saint Croix, U.S. Virgin Islands
Plantations in the Danish West Indies
Buildings and structures completed in 1851
National Register of Historic Places in the United States Virgin Islands
1851 establishments in North America
1850s establishments in the Caribbean
1850s establishments in Denmark
19th century in the Danish West Indies